B. Paranikumar, also spelled Baranikumar and Bharani Kumar, is an Indian politician and a former Member of the Legislative Assembly of Tamil Nadu. He was elected to the Tamil Nadu legislative assembly from Tiruchirappalli - I constituency as a Dravida Munnetra Kazhagam (DMK) candidate in the 1996 and 2001 elections. He was not selected as a candidate for the 2006 elections.

Paranikumar is a son of M. Balakrishnan, who died in 2010 and was a significant figure in the DMK and leader of Tiruchirapalli Municipal Council.

References 

Living people
Dravida Munnetra Kazhagam politicians
Tamil Nadu MLAs 1996–2001
Tamil Nadu MLAs 2001–2006
Year of birth missing (living people)